was a Japanese samurai of the late Edo period who served the Nanbu clan of the Morioka Domain. He was made a page in 1849 in service to Nanbu Toshiyoshi; five years later he became a karō, and led a reform program in the Morioka domainal administration. He was a colleague of the more famous Narayama Sado.

References
 at toraneko.cside.com (21 June 2008)
@±-Ðªµ@È©Â©³ at jpco.sakura.ne.jp (21 June 2008)

Karō
Samurai
1835 births
1912 deaths
Japanese pages
People of the Boshin War